The 2017 season of The Challenge: Champs vs. Stars is the first season of a recurring special mini-series of MTV's long-running reality game show, The Challenge premiered November 21, 2017 and follows on from 2016's The Challenge: Champs vs. Pros. In the eight-week event, eleven alum from  The Real World, The Challenge, and Are You the One? who have made it to the finals on a regular season of The Challenge compete against celebrities.

Contestants

Game summary

Challenge games
 Tow Truck: Starting with four players, two of each gender, teams must pull a semi-truck up a small incline from start to finish. Across the track are checkpoints. the first check point adds two more players, for a total of six pulling, while the other checkpoints have two players from each team that can swap out with a current player, if they desire. First team to finish wins.
 Winners: Champs - MVP: Zach
 Parkour the Course: All across the arena flags are placed with pints ranging from 1 point up to 5 points per flag. Each team sends individuals to try to grab as many flags as they can. The opposing team from across the arena has access to a slingshot to try to hit the runner with a ball to end the round. The opposing team also sends one player to try to tag the runner to end the round. Each individual player gets one round on offense and one round on defense. Most points by the end of all the runs wins.
 Winners: Champs - MVP: Emily
 Slamball: Similar to Basketball, in three rounds, each team send three players to try and score as many points as possible across an arena of trampolines. Players cannot jump around different trampolines with the ball. They must either shoot it, or pass it. If the shot is made from a marked trampoline, the team scores three points, instead of the usual one point. First to win three out of five rounds wins.
 Winners: Champs - MVP: Zach
 Push Ball: Similar to soccer, teams must score as many goals as possible using a giant soccer ball in two rounds. Each team assigns player to defense and offense. After two 10-minutes rounds, most goals wins.
 Winners: Champs - MVP: Aneesa
 Jumbo Foosball: Similar to the table game of Foosball, teams must try to kick the ball into the opposing team's goal to score a point. Players are tied to a pole and arranged similar to the table game, only being able to move left or right. Most points by the end of the game wins.
 Winners: Champs - MVP: Wes
 Flag Pole: Individually, players must run towards a pole and must bring it down into the water. They must then swim as fast as they can towards a buoy. There are flags the players can grab to subtract seconds off their total times, with the harder to reach flags being worth more time subtracted. Fastest combined team time wins.
 Winners: Champs - MVP: CT
 Sink or Swim: Competing as individuals, players must swim through a five obstacle course. At the end of each obstacle, players must release assigned balls before moving on to the next obstacle. The fastest male and female from each team win guaranteed spots in the final. They also get to choose one more player from their team to advance to the finals.
 Winners 
Champs: Bananas & Emily
Stars: Josh & Michelle
 Championship Series: In the final challenge, the teams participate in five challenges. The first four challenges are used to determine who will get an advantage in the fifth challenge. Whoever wins the fifth challenge wins the final challenge.
 Don't Trip: Teams must traverse from pedestal to pedestal to reach a flag at the end of the course. If players fall off the pedestal or their one plank used to traverse each pedestal touches the floor, the team must start over. Once they reach the end, they must open a combination lock using numbers gained from each pedestal they crossed. First team to raise their team flag wins.
 Winners: Champs
 #Hard AF: Similar to "X Knocks the Spot" from Battle of the Exes, players of the same team stand on a platform and have to duck and jump over swinging bars. The opposing team has to try to knock off one player using rubber balls. If one player falls, their time is stopped and the team switch sides. Whichever team has the longer time after each team has gone wins.
 Winners: Champs
 Face Race: Teams must race around a race track with a small wooden car while trying to hit and collect cardboard faces of the opposing team. One team member is in the small wooden car to steer while blind-folded as the other two members push and collect. Once they reach the end of the track, they must arrange the order of the faces according to their charity they are playing for. First team to correctly arrange the faces to the charity wins.
 Winners: Stars
 Slide Ball: In a first-to-five game, teams must try to throw a ball in the opposing team's goal to score a point. The arena is very slippery and soapy and players are oiled up. First to 5 goals wins.
 Winners: Champs
 Tower of Power: Players are shackled together and must race around the stands to collect large plank puzzle pieces. Once their team collects all their respective pieces, they must dig through sand to find individual keys for each member to release them from their restraints. Each team has 25 total keys, minus three for each challenge they won in the Championship Series. Once released, they must complete their puzzle pyramid using the pieces they collect. First to finish the puzzle pyramid and scale up it is the winner of The Challenge: Champs vs. Stars.
 Winners: Champs

Arena Games
Target Practice: While standing on rotating platforms, players must try to throw balls across to their respective goals to score points. If any player falls off, their competitor can continue the round until they fall off or run out of balls. After two rounds, the player with the most points win.
Played by: Cory vs. Matt
Ground Control: Players must pull themselves down several pegs to try to reach their button to push. Each player is directly linked to their competitor, with their competitor being pulled further away as they pull closer to the button. First player to push the button wins.
Played by: Wes vs. Romeo
Lasso Me: Players are each given a hoop that they must try to wring it around their competitors body. Played in a best 3 out of 5 format, first to 3 pints wins.
Played by: Tori vs. Shawn
Tic Tac Hole: In a combination of mini-golf and Connect 4, players must first try to sink a golf ball into the hole in the middle of the arena. If they are successful, they can place a connect 4 piece onto the board. Players repeat this process until a player achieves 4 in a row on the main board. The first player that achieves 4 in a row on the board wins.
Played by: Bananas vs. Riff Raff
Cage Match: Players star in the middle of a caged arena. When the round starts, they must try to grab the rope in the middle and bring it outside of the cage. If there is a stalemate from both players, to which there is barely any movement, the round resets back to start. First player to successfully get the rope outside the cage wins.
Played by: Aneesa vs. Michelle

Elimination chart

Episode progress

Teams
 The contestant is on the Champs team.
 The contestant is on the Stars team.
Competition
 The contestant won the final challenge.
 The contestant did not win the final challenge.
 The contestant was named "MVP" for their team and was immune from the Arena.
 The contestant won in the Arena.
 The contestant lost in the Arena and was eliminated.
 The contestant was voted into the Arena, but did not have to compete.
 The contestant didn't win the challenge or wasn't picked to be in the final challenge and was eliminated.
 The contestant won the team challenge, but was disqualified from the competition due to physical violence.
 The contestant was forced to leave the competition due to injury.
 The contestant withdrew from the competition.

Notes

Episodes

References

External links
 

The Challenge (TV series)
Television shows set in Los Angeles
2017 American television seasons
2018 American television seasons
Celebrity reality television series